The Massachusetts Paid Sick Days Initiative was a successful initiative voted on in the Massachusetts general election held on November 4, 2014. It was one of four 2014 ballot measures put to public vote.

Voting
Question 4 on the ballot, "Earned Sick Time for Employees".

A YES VOTE on the question would allow workers to earn and use a set amount of paid or unpaid sick time per year based on specific conditions, such as the size of their companies.

A NO VOTE maintains current laws.

Source:

Implementation
The law went into effect on July 1, 2015, with approximately 200 clarifications and adjustments made by the Massachusetts Attorney General's office. The law requires that companies with 11 or more employees give workers up to 40 hours of paid sick time a year, while smaller companies may offer it unpaid.

References

Further reading

External links
 2014 Ballot Questions at sec.state.ma.us
 Question 4 text via masslive.com

2014 Massachusetts ballot measures
Initiatives in the United States